Sinjar Subdistrict  is a Syrian Nahiyah (subdistrict) located in Ma'arrat al-Nu'man District in Idlib.  According to the Syria Central Bureau of Statistics (CBS), Sinjar Subdistrict had a population of 33721 in the 2004 census.

بيت الحصري 

Subdistricts of Idlib Governorate